Gérard Piouffre (20 January 1946 – 20 April 2020) was a French journalist, writer, and historian.

Biography
Born in Orléans on 20 January 1946, Piouffre joined the French Air Force, where he was a certified air traffic controller. Following his service, he was a traffic officer for British European Airways, then a steward for Air France.

Piouffre studied naval archaeology at the Séminaire de Jean Boudriot, in association with the Musée national de la Marine. He also studied arsenal modeling with a friend who was a cabinetmaker. He published more than 30 books on naval history, and authored several hundred press articles. He participated in many documentaries and was a guest in numerous radio shows in France and abroad.

Distinctions
Knight of the Ordre du Mérite Maritime (15 January 2015)
Officer of the Ordre des Arts et des Lettres (16 September 2019, Knight on 15 December 2000)
Médaille de la Jeunesse, des Sports et de l'Engagement Associatif (7 January 1994)
Aeronautical Medal (9 July 1997)

Publications
L’Aurore : frégate légère de 22 canons (1994)
Naissance de la marine américaine (1995)
La Guerre russo-japonaise sur mer 1904 - 1905 (1999)
Manuel de modélisme
La Légende du Cutty Sark
Trois Siècles de croiseurs français (2001)
Voiliers et Hommes de mer (2002)
Pirates (2002)
Les mots de la marine (2003)
L'Hermione, frégate de 1779 (2005)
Le gréement des navires anciens (2005)
L'artillerie de marine des origines à nos jours: traité de modélisme naval (2005)
La Première guerre mondiale (2006)
Le courrier doit passer: l'aventure de l'Aéropostale (2007)
Dictionnaire de la marine (2007)
La guerre d'Algérie (2008)
Pirates, Flibustiers et Forbans: Des origines à nos jours (2009)
Paquebots: Des lignes régulières aux croisières (2009)
Le Titanic ne répond plus (2009)
L'Âge d'or des voyages en paquebot (2009)
Titanesques Travaux: 150 ans de grands chantiers (2010)
La Guerre russo-japonaise (2010)
Nous étions à bord du Titanic (2012)
Les Grands naufrages, du Titanic au Costa Concordia (2012)
Les grandes inventions (2013)
Les traites négrières (2013)
Titanic, la Monographie (2013)
1914 - L'année terrible (2014)
Un crime de guerre en 1915 ? - Le torpillage du Lusitania (2015)
Lapérouse - Le voyage sans retour (2016)
Eurêka ! Les Grandes Inventions de l'Histoire (2017)
Sauveteurs en Mer (2017)
Le Titanic - Vérités et légendes (2018)
Pirates, corsaires, flibustiers et autres forbans (2018)
Corsaires, flibustiers et autres forbans (2019)

References

1946 births
2020 deaths
Writers from Orléans
French journalists
21st-century French historians
20th-century French historians
French naval historians